James Edward Paxson (December 19, 1932 – October 28, 2014) was an American professional basketball player.

A 6'6" swingman, Paxson attended the University of Dayton during the mid-1950s, averaging 10.9 points per game in his collegiate career. He helped the Flyers attain two consecutive second-place finishes in the National Invitation Tournament. After his sophomore year, Paxson Sr. was drafted into the Army during the Korean War. He spent two years in the Army and played with the Armed Forced All-Stars who won the Pan-Am games in Mexico in 1955 before returning for his final season in 1955-56. He averaged 15.5 points per game as a senior as the Flyers went 25-4 and lost to Louisville in the NIT championship game. [6] After graduating in 1956, he was selected by the Minneapolis Lakers with the third pick of the NBA draft, then played two seasons in the NBA with the Lakers and Cincinnati Royals. When his basketball career ended, he entered the insurance business.

Paxson's sons Jim and John both played in the NBA and have also served as NBA general managers. His son Michael played collegiately at Ohio University for one year.

Paxson died on October 28, 2014. He was 81.

Notes

1932 births
2014 deaths
American men's basketball players
Basketball players at the 1955 Pan American Games
Basketball players from Indiana
Basketball players from Dayton, Ohio
Cincinnati Royals players
Dayton Flyers men's basketball players
Medalists at the 1955 Pan American Games
Minneapolis Lakers draft picks
Minneapolis Lakers players
Pan American Games gold medalists for the United States
Pan American Games medalists in basketball
People from Jay County, Indiana
Rochester Royals draft picks
Shooting guards
Small forwards